An army ant is any species of ant known for aggressive predatory foraging groups.

Army Ants may also refer to:

 Army Ants (toy line), a 1987 toy soldier line from Hasbro
 Army Ants, a scrapped Disney animated film from 1998.
 "Army Ants",  a 1994 song by Stone Temple Pilots from the album Purple
 "Army Ants",  a 1997 song by The Tea Party from the album Transmission
 "Army Ants",  a 2006 song by Tom Waits from the album Orphans: Brawlers, Bawlers & Bastards